Robert Hurley is a translator who has translated the work of several leading French philosophers into English, including Michel Foucault, Gilles Deleuze and Georges Bataille. For example, he led the team translating selections from Foucault's three-volume Dits et écrits, 1954-88.

Works

Translations
(with Mark Seem and Helen P. Lane) Gilles Deleuze and Félix Guattari, Anti-Oedipus: Capitalism and Schizophrenia, New York: Viking, 1977
Pierre Clastres, Society against the State: the leader as servant and the human uses of power among the Indians of the Americas, 1977
Michel Foucault, The History of Sexuality. Volume 1, 1979
Jacques Donzelot, The Policing of Families, 1980
Gilles Deleuze, Spinoza: Practical Philosophy, San Francisco: City Light Books, 1988
Georges Bataille, The Accursed Share: an Essay on General Economy. Volume 1: Consumption, Zone Books, 1988. 
Georges Bataille, Theory of Religion, Zone Books, 1989
Georges Bataille, The Accursed Share: an Essay on General Economy. Volume 2: The History of Eroticism, Zone Books, 1993
Georges Bataille, The Accursed Share: an Essay on General Economy. Volume 3: Sovereignty, Zone Books, 1993
Michel Foucault, Ethics: Subjectivity and Truth, 2000
The Invisible Committee, To Our Friends, Semiotext(e), 2015
The Invisible Committee, Now, Semiotext(e), 2017
Tiqqun, The Cybernetic Hypothesis, Semiotext(e), 2020

Edited works
(with Pierre-Marie beaude) Poétique du Divin, 2001

References

External links

Year of birth missing (living people)
Living people
French–English translators